was a Japanese cinematographer.

Career
Born in Kyoto, Miyagawa was taken with sumi-e Chinese ink painting from the age of eleven and began to sell his work as an illustrator while a teenager. He became interested in the cinema during the 1920s, particularly admiring the German Expressionist silents. He joined the Nikkatsu film company in 1926 after graduating from Kyoto Commercial School. He began as a laboratory technician before becoming an assistant cameraman.

Miyagawa is best known for his tracking shots, particularly those in Rashomon (1950), the first of his three collaborations with filmmaker Akira Kurosawa. The other films with Kurosawa were Yojimbo (1961) and Kagemusha (1980). He also worked on multiple films directed by Kenji Mizoguchi, including Ugetsu (1953), but only on a single Yasujirō Ozu production, Floating Weeds (1959). He oversaw 164 cameramen for Kon Ichikawa's Tokyo Olympiad (1965), a documentary which necessitated the development of new exposure meters and viewfinders. Earlier, he had worked with Ichikawa on the drama films, Enjō ("The Temple of the Golden Pavilion", 1958), Odd Obsession (aka, The Key, 1959) and The Broken Commandment (1962).

Miyagawa worked with Masahiro Shinoda in the 1980s, and at the end of his life was supervising the director's Owls' Castle ("Fukuro no Shiro"/"Castle of Owls", 1999).

Miyagawa is considered the inventor of the cinematographic technique known as bleach bypass, for Ichikawa's film Her Brother (1960).

Selected filmography 
 
 
 
 
 
 
 
 
 
 
 
 
 Floating Weeds (1959)
 
 Her Brother (1960)
 
 
 
 
 
 A Certain Killer (1967)
 Zatoichi and the Fugitives (1968)
 Zatoichi Meets Yojimbo (1970)
 Zatoichi Goes to the Fire Festival (1970)
 Lone Wolf and Cub: Baby Cart in Peril (1972)

References

External links

1908 births
1999 deaths
Japanese cinematographers